Georges Wahler (30 August 1933 – 19 January 2008) was a French sports shooter. He competed in the 50 metre rifle, three positions and 50 metre rifle, prone events at the 1960 Summer Olympics.

References

1933 births
2008 deaths
French male sport shooters
Olympic shooters of France
Shooters at the 1960 Summer Olympics
Sportspeople from Colmar